FC Metalurg is a football club from Pernik, Bulgaria. Between 1997 and 1999 the team counted two participations in the A PFG, the top division of Bulgarian football. However, the club now plays in the fourth level of Bulgarian football, A RFG Pernik.

History
The club was founded in 1957 as Zavod Stalin by the merger of two local teams Stroitel and Torpedo. The team finally became known as Metalurg in 1963. In the same year the club were promoted for the first time to B PFG.

In 1997, Metalurg achieved a historic promotion to the A Group. The team performed decently in their first season of top level football, achieving a mid-table finish. In terms of sporting performance, the second season in the elite was also successful, however it was marred by off-field controversy. It was discovered that Metalurg was involved in a match-fixing scandal with other teams, which resulted in the Bulgarian Football Union expelling the club from the A Group, ending their two-year stay in the elite. 

It was restored in 2013 after being dissolved in 2008 and started from the 4th league.

Players

Past seasons

References

External links
bgclubs page

Football clubs in Bulgaria
Association football clubs established in 1957
Association football clubs established in 2013
Association football clubs disestablished in 2008
Pernik
1957 establishments in Bulgaria
2013 establishments in Bulgaria
2008 disestablishments in Bulgaria